The CSA keyboard, or CAN/CSA Z243.200-92, is the official keyboard layout of Canada. Often referred to as ACNOR, it is best known for its use in the Canadian computer industry for the French ACNOR keyboard layout, published as CAN/CSA Z243.200-92.

History 
ACNOR is a former French-language acronym of the Association canadienne de normalisation. The English name is the Canadian Standards Association, now known as CSA Group, a standards organization headquartered in Canada. The initialism "CSA" is now used in both official languages.

See also
 Keyboard layout
 QWERTY
 CSA Group

References

External links

Telecommunications in Canada
Computer standards
Latin-script keyboard layouts